Þistilfjörður (sometimes anglicised as Thistilfjördur) is a bay in northeast Iceland, between the Rifstangi and Langanes peninsulas, near the town of Þórshöfn (Thorshofn). The name also refers to the region immediately to the southwest of the bay, roughly corresponding to Svalbarðshreppur municipality.

The name is genitive to the first settler Ketil þistill but landnamabok is otherwise rather few worded about him and does not mention from where in Norway he came.

Bays of Iceland